Johannes Franklin (born 6 October 1981) is a South African rugby union player, currently playing for  as a hooker.

He was also included in the Lions Super Rugby squad in 2010.

He was named in the  squad for the 2013 Super Rugby season.

References

South African rugby union players
Eastern Province Elephants players
Southern Kings players
Living people
1981 births
Lions (United Rugby Championship) players
Pumas (Currie Cup) players
People from Randfontein
Rugby union players from Gauteng
Rugby union hookers